Dean Brown (born August 19, 1955) is an American jazz fusion guitarist and session musician.

Career
Dean Brown graduated from Berklee College of Music in 1977. During that time in Boston he performed with his own groups as well as Tiger's Baku, replacing Mike Stern in that group before moving to New York around 1980 and joining Billy Cobham's band.

Since 1982 Brown has been recording and/or touring worldwide with his own projects as well as with artists Marcus Miller, David Sanborn, Eric Clapton, Billy Cobham, the Brecker Brothers, Roberta Flack, Bob James, Joe Zawinul, George Duke, Victor Bailey, Bill Evans, and Steve Smith's Vital Information.

As a solo artist, Brown has produced five solo CDs with his fifth solo CD "Rolajafufu" just being released in Spring 2016. His first titled "Here" (2001) on ESC Records, is his all-star debut CD featuring jazz greats Michael Brecker, Marcus Miller, David Sanborn, Billy Cobham, George Duke, Randy Brecker, Christian McBride, Don Alias, Bill Evans, Bernard Wright and many others. His second record "Groove Warrior" (2004) on ESC Records, features another all-star lineup with Lalah Hathaway, Marcus Miller, Bernard Wright, JuJu House, Poogie Bell, Schuyler Deale, Booker King, and Patches Stewart, just to name a few. His third "DBIII" (2009)  on the BHM label features an all-star power trio with musical greats Dennis Chambers and Will Lee. His fourth CD "Unfinished Business"(2012) featuring yet another all-star cast of musicians with Marvin "Smitty" Smith, Kirk Whalum, Dennis Chambers, Jimmy Earl, Gerry Etkins and Hadrien Feraud among others.

Brown's studio guitar work can be heard on over 100 albums, including four Grammy Award winners. Records such as the Brecker Brothers' Return of the Brecker Brothers and Out of the Loop, Marcus Miller's The Sun Don't Lie, Billy Cobham's Warning, and Joe Zawinul's Faces and Places are just a few out of the long list. His live performances include DVDs with Marcus Miller, Billy Cobham, Gil Evans, David Sanborn, Louie Bellson, Bob James, and Steve Smith's Vital Information. Brown's compositions and arrangements are featured on albums by Les McCann, Dennis Chambers, Ricky Peterson, Steve Smith's Vital Information, and Billy Cobham.

As an educator and clinician Dean conducts master classes at schools and venues at home and abroad and teaches several classes of his own curriculum at Musicians Institute in Hollywood, California since 2006. Dean has also released an instructional/live DVD with publishing giant Hal Leonard for Musicians Institute titled "Modern Techniques for the Electric Guitarist"(2008) and has had several featured instructional articles in Guitar Player Magazine (US), Guitar World (US), Gittare and Bass (G), Bass Player, Jazz Life (Jp), Big Box (I), Muzikus (Cz), Guitarist (Fr) and 20th Century Guitar magazines (US).

Discography

As leader
 Here (ESC, 2000)
 Groove Warrior (ESC, 2004)
 DBIII Live at the Cotton Club Tokyo (BHM, 2009)
 Unfinished Business (Moosicus, 2012)
 Rolajafufu (Dean Brown Music, 2016)

As sideman
With Billy Cobham
 Observations & (Elektra Musician, 1982)
 Smokin (Elektra Musician, 1983)
 Warning (GRP, 1985)
 Powerplay (GRP, 1986)
 By Design (Fnac Music 1992)
 Palindrome (BHM, 2010)
 Spectrum 40 Live (Creative Multimedia Concepts, 2015)

With Bob James
 Ivory Coast (Tappan Zee/Warner Bros., 1988)
 Grand Piano Canyon (Warner Bros., 1990)
 Restless (Warner Bros., 1994)

With Marcus Miller
 The Sun Don't Lie (Dreyfus, 1993)
 Tales (Dreyfus, 1995)
 The Ozell Tapes: The Official Bootleg (3 Deuces 2002)
 Master of All Trades (Dreyfus, 2005)
 Silver Rain (Koch, 2005)

With David Sanborn
 Hearsay (Elektra, 1994)
 Songs from the Night Before (Elektra, 1996)
 Inside (Elektra, 1999)

With Kirk Whalum
 And You Know That! (Columbia, 1988)
 The Promise (CBS, 1989)
 Cache (Columbia, 1993)

With others
 Victor Bailey, That's Right (ESC, 2001)
 Brecker Brothers, Return of the Brecker Brothers (GRP, 1992)
 Brecker Brothers, Out of the Loop (GRP, 1994)
 Randy Brecker, The Brecker Brothers Band Reunion (Piloo, 2013)
 Till Brönner, Midnight (Button, 1996)
 Till Brönner, Chattin With Chet (Verve, 2000)
 Dennis Chambers, Outbreak (ESC, 2002)
 Dennis Chambers, Planet Earth (BHM, 2005)
 Color Me Badd, Time and Chance (Giant, 1993)
 Tom Coster, from the Street (JVC, 1996)
 DJ Logic & Jason Miles, Global Noize (Shanachie, 2008)
 Bill Evans, Touch (ESC, 1999)
 Bill Evans, Soul Insider (ESC, 2000)
 Roberta Flack, Let It Be Roberta (429 Records, 2012)
 Eddie Harris, The Last Concert (ACT, 1997)
 Al Jarreau, Miki Howard, Marcus Miller, David Sanborn, Everybody Is a Star Live in Tokyo (Jazz Hour, 2010)
 Eric Marienthal, Sweet Talk (Peak, 2003)
 Les McCann, Pump It Up (ESC, 2002)
 Jason Miles, World Tour (Lipstick, 1994)
 Jason Miles, Miles to Miles (Narada, 2005)
 Bernard Purdie, Bernard Purdie's Soul to Jazz (ACT, 1996)
 Steve Smith, Vital Information (Columbia, 1983)
 Steve Smith, Orion (Columbia, 1984)
 Steps Ahead, Yin-Yang (NYC, 1992)
 Vital Information, Global Beat (Columbia, 1986)
 Lenny White, Present Tense (Hip Bop, 1995)
 Lenny White, Renderors of Spirit (Hip Bop, 1996)
 Joe Zawinul, Faces & Places (Cream/Jms 2002)

Video
 1987 Steve Smith, Part I and II
 2001 David Sanborn, David Sanborn and Friends
 2002 Gil Evans, Gil Evans and His Orchestra
 2003 Louie Bellson, Louie Bellson and His Big Band
 2006 Marcus Miller Master of All Trades 
 2007 Billy Cobham/Louie Bellson, Cobham Meets Bellson
 2008 Dean Brown, Modern Techniques for the Electric Guitarist

References

External links
 Official site

1955 births
Living people
American session musicians
American jazz guitarists
Berklee College of Music alumni
American male guitarists
20th-century American guitarists
20th-century American male musicians
American male jazz musicians
Vital Information members